The  is a freight-only railway company in Aichi Prefecture, Japan, operating since 1971. The two lines operated by the company lines serve the industrial area of the Port of Kinuura, Mikawa Bay. They mainly transport cement, fly ash, and calcium carbonate.

Lines

Both lines are  gauge and non-electrified.

Rolling stock

As of 1 April 2014, the company operates a fleet four 1,350 hp Class KE65 diesel locomotives (numbered KE65 1 to 3 and 5), based at Handa-Futō Depot. Locomotive number KE65 2 has been stored out of use since September 2011. The locomotives receive major overhauls at JR facilities such as Omiya and Hiroshima Works.

History
The Kinuura Rinkai Railway was established on 8 April 1971. The Handa Line opened on 15 November 1975, and the Hekinan Line opened on 25 May 1977, from Higashiura to Gongenzaki. The section of the line from Hekinan to Gongenzaki was closed as of 1 April 2006.

See also
List of railway companies in Japan
Transport in Greater Nagoya

References

External links

  

Railway companies of Japan
Rail transport in Aichi Prefecture
Railway companies established in 1971
Japanese companies established in 1971